The Shire of Strathfieldsaye was a local government area immediately to the east and southeast of the regional city of Bendigo, Victoria, Australia, and included the eastern suburbs of Bendigo's metropolitan area.

History

Strathfieldsaye was first incorporated as a road district on 20 August 1861, and became a shire on 17 September 1866.

On 20 July 1993, Strathfieldsaye Council was suspended, and a commissioner appointed, after allegations of the council being divided and unworkable.

On 7 April 1994, the Shire of Strathfieldsaye was abolished, and along with the City of Bendigo, the Borough of Eaglehawk, the Rural City of Marong and the Shire of Huntly, was merged into the newly created City of Greater Bendigo.

Wards

The Shire of Strathfieldsaye was divided into three wards, each of which elected three councillors:
 Axedale Ward
 Mandurang Ward
 Strathfieldsaye Ward

Towns and localities
 Axedale
 Bendigo East
 Diamond Hill
 Emu Creek
 Lake Eppalock
 Junortoun
 Kangaroo Flat
 Kennington*
 Longlea
 Mandurang
 Mandurang South
 Mosquito Creek
 Myrtle Creek
 Sedgwick
 Spring Gully
 Strathdale
 Strathfieldsaye

* Council seat.

Population

* Estimate in the 1958 Victorian Year Book.

References

External links
 Victorian Places - Strathfieldsaye Shire

Strathfieldsaye
1861 establishments in Australia
Bendigo